TransMilitary is a 2018 American documentary film directed by Gabriel Silverman and Fiona Dawson, about transgender service members fighting to serve openly in the U.S. military. The film premiered at the South by Southwest Film Festival in 2018, and was released in the United States on January 8, 2019.

TransMilitary was the first documentary feature to receive financial assistance from GLAAD Media Institute.

Synopsis
Building upon the short New York Times op-doc, Transgender, at War and in Love (2015), this feature documents the lives of four American active duty transgender troops who are advocating to end the ban on their service. The film gives insight into their familial, personal and professional lives, which represent approximately 15,500 transgender service members within America's all-volunteer military. After a series of secret meetings with top brass officials inside the Pentagon, their policy battle is won. But President Trump's tweets in 2017 flip their lives upside down yet again, leaving them with the question of if they will be finally granted the right to serve.

Appearances 

 El Cook
 Logan Ireland
 Jennifer Peace
 Laila Villanueva
 Sue Fulton
 Jesse M. Ehrenfeld 
 James P. Isenhower III
 Eric Fanning
 Emma Thompson
 Daniel Fisher

Release 
TransMilitary premiered at SXSW on March 10, 2018, where it won the Audience Award. Shortly after, the film entered more than 10 film festivals and won several awards all over the world. TransMilitary made its television debut on Logo TV in November 2018.

Reception 
On Rotten Tomatoes, the film has an approval rating of  based on  reviews. Beth Sullivan of Austin Chronicle calls it "informative and visually engaging." John DeFore of Hollywood Reporter calls TransMilitary "an affecting and, despite present circumstances, hopeful doc." Jacqueline Coley of Rotten Tomatoes picks TransMilitary as one of "the 8 best films [she] saw at SXSW 2018."

References

External links 
 
 
 

2018 films
American documentary films
American LGBT-related films
2018 LGBT-related films
2020 LGBT-related films
Transgender-related documentary films
Films about the United States Armed Forces
2010s English-language films
2020s English-language films
2010s American films